The Saegheh ("Lightning" or "Thunder" in Persian) (also spelled Saegre, Saeghe, Saeqeh, etc.) is any of at least eight completely separate Iranian weapons systems: a rocket-propelled grenade (RPG) warhead, an anti-tank guided missile family, a surface-to-surface rocket, a target drone family, an air-to-air missile, a claimed stealth unmanned aerial vehicle, a fighter jet, and an anti-ship cruise missile.

History
The first system, the Saeghe 1, is an Iranian reverse-engineered clone of the American M47 Dragon wire-guided SACLOS ATGM, introduced in 2001. It seems to have entered production in 2002. Iran later introduced the Saeghe 2, a more advanced variant with a tandem-warhead to defeat explosive reactive armor, and the Saeghe-4, with a thermobaric warhead.

Despite being essentially obsolete, Saegheh anti-tank guided missiles have been exported to Syria, Hezbollah, and Shia militias in Iraq. The Saeghe 1 and Saeghe 2 were in production and service as of 2011, though they were not widely deployed. The Saeghe ATGM is extremely hard to aim and in Iranian service it appears to be limited to IRGC and rapid response forces.

In 2006, Iran tested a completely unrelated short-range surface-to-surface missile that is also named Saegheh.

Other Saegheh name designations
Under the Saegheh name, Iran has also built a variant warhead for RPG-7 style rocket launchers. Iran also uses the Saeghe name for a target drone (which comes in two variants: Saeghe 1 and Saeghe 2) and an air-to-air missile.

The semi-official Tasnim news agency of Iran reported in September 2016 that an unmanned aerial vehicle (UAV, drone) named Saegheh similar to the US RQ-170 Sentinel spy drone had been built. It was said to be able to carry four precision-guided bombs; range was not stated. An RQ-170 had been captured by Iran in 2011.

The Saegheh name is further reused for the HESA Saeqeh, a low production jet fighter, and for the Saeghe anti-ship cruise missile.

References

External links
China View Video and info

Anti-tank guided missiles of Iran
Surface-to-surface missiles of Iran
Anti-tank guided missiles
Guided missiles of Iran
Military equipment introduced in the 2000s